In algebraic geometry, a branch of mathematics, the Lefschetz theorem on (1,1)-classes, named after Solomon Lefschetz, is a classical statement relating holomorphic line bundles on a compact Kähler manifold to classes in its integral cohomology. It is the only case of the Hodge conjecture which has been proved for all Kähler manifolds.

Statement of the theorem 
Let X be a compact Kähler manifold. By Hodge theory, the de Rham cohomology group H2(X, C) decomposes as a direct sum , and it can be proven that the image of c1 lies in H1,1(X).

In the special case where X is a projective variety, holomorphic line bundles are in bijection with linear equivalences class of divisors, and given a divisor D on X with associated line bundle O(D), the class c1(O(D)) is Poincaré dual to the homology class given by D. Thus, this establishes the usual formulation of the Hodge conjecture for divisors in projective varieties.

Proof using normal functions 
Lefschetz's original proof worked on projective surfaces and used normal functions, which were introduced by Poincaré. Suppose that Ct is a pencil of curves on X. Each of these curves has a Jacobian variety JCt (if a curve is singular, there is an appropriate generalized Jacobian variety). These can be assembled into a family , the Jacobian of the pencil, which comes with a projection map π to the base T of the pencil. A normal function is a (holomorphic) section of π.

Fix an embedding of X in PN, and choose a pencil of curves Ct on X.  For a fixed curve Γ on X, the intersection of Γ and Ct is a divisor  on Ct, where d is the degree of X. Fix a base point p0 of the pencil.  Then the divisor  is a divisor of degree zero, and consequently it determines a class νΓ(t) in the Jacobian JCt for all t. The map from t to νΓ(t) is a normal function. 

Henri Poincaré proved that for a general pencil of curves, all normal functions arose as νΓ(t) for some choice of Γ. Lefschetz proved that any normal function determined a class in H2(X, Z) and that the class of νΓ is the fundamental class of Γ. Furthermore, he proved that a class in H2(X, Z) is the class of a normal function if and only if it lies in H1,1. Together with Poincaré's existence theorem, this proves the theorem on (1,1)-classes.

Proof using sheaf cohomology 
Because X is a complex manifold, it admits an exponential sheaf sequence

Taking sheaf cohomology of this exact sequence gives maps

The first Chern class map is c1 by definition, so it suffices to show that i* is zero.

Because X is Kähler, Hodge theory implies that . However, i* factors through the map from H2(X, Z) to H2(X, C), and on H2(X, C), i* is the restriction of the projection onto H0,2(X).

References

Bibliography 
 
  Reprinted in 

Theorems in algebraic geometry